Calle Ciega is a boy band from Venezuela. The group, created and managed by Artist developers and management team formed by Ruben Ferrer Rubio and Félix Rodríguez (Junior), originally began singing merengue-based songs, but as the different incarnations of the group progressed the songs moved away from merengue toward the more urban sounds of hip hop and reggaeton.

The first version of Calle Ciega was a seven-piece outfit consisting of Damian Alvarez, David Díaz, Vladimir Mundo, Kingston Luna, Pablo Rivero, Eduardo "Black" Hernandez y Fernando Pineda. Their albums were all released and produced by singer Ricardo Montaner's own record label "Hecho a Mano" and by musical producer Fernando Rojo. The group were extremely successful in their home country, with their first two albums earning them gold and platinum discs, respectively. Alvarez and Pineda left after the first two albums and Christian Rigu was added to the group for their third album, Seguimos Bailando.

A new version of the group, now produced and managed by Rafael Quintana, Enrique Verhelst, and Ruben Ferrer Rubio, recorded Una Vez Más in 2005, with the line-up of Jesus "Chino" Miranda, Miguel Ignacio "Nacho" Mendoza, Luis Fernando "Luifer" Romero, Kent Jaimes and Emilio Vizcaino. The album was also released in the United States by Prisma Records. Miranda and Mendoza left in 2007 to form the successful duo Chino & Nacho before pursuing solo careers from 2017 onwards. The remaining three members continued for a while before splitting up, with Emilio Vizcaino, who had earlier been part of the Venezuelan musical project Fuera de Clase, and Luifer teaming up in Los Cadillacs.

The third version of Calle Ciega was formed in 2012, featuring Anderson Castro, Jhey Sosa, Aldo Armas, Kevin Arvelo and Sandy Carrero, and released a single "Mía".

The latest line-up of Calle Ciega was unveiled in 2017. The new group consists of Alonson "Alon" Urbina, Edwar "Hommy" Alvarado, Gabriel "Gabo" Mundo and Hecson "Hache" Hernández. The quartet released two singles, "Mi Persona Favorita" and "Ya No Hay Dolor" and a seven-track album titled 2018.

Discography

Studio albums
1998: Caliente
1999: No Pares de Sudar
2001: Seguimos Bailando
2005: Una Vez Más
2006: Edicion Especial
2007: Más Caliente
2008: Los Nenes De La Casa
2010: Quedate Conmigo
2017: 2018

Compilations
2000: Exitos

Collaborations
2000: Asi Son Bonco (Con Guaco)
2004: Dejame Entrar A Tu Corazon (Con Tecupae)
2005: Pase Lo Que Pase (Con Mr Brian)
2005: Consuelito (Con Calibu y Eddie Castro)

MixTapes
2007: Desde Calle Ciega (Con Chino y Nacho, Los Cadillacs, Franco y Oscarcito)

Singles
2005: Mi Cachorrita
2005: Como Te Extraña Mi Cama
2006: Tu y Yo
2006: El Vestido Rojo
2006: La Pastillita
2006: Casi Soy Libre
2007: La Prueba Final
2007: Dile
2007: Aunque Mal Paguen (Remix)
2008: Vete
2008: Dile (Electro Dance Mix)
2012: Apaga la Luz
2012: Amándote Más
2012: Mía
2014: La Pastillita (Reloaded)
2017: Mi Persona Favorita
2017: Ya No Hay Dolor

References

Musical groups established in 1996
Reggaeton musicians
Venezuelan musical groups